Daniele Mannini (born 25 October 1983) is an Italian footballer who plays as a winger. Appearing for clubs such as Pisa, Brescia, Napoli and Sampdoria over the course of a near two decade long professional career, he made over 150 appearances in Serie A, also playing for several seasons in Serie B and Serie C. Following his professional retirement in 2020 he moved to England, where he came out of retirement in July 2022 to play for Northern Counties East Football League Division One club Beverley Town.

Career

Early career
Son of former ACF Fiorentina goalkeeper Alessandro Mannini, Daniele started his professional career at hometown club Viareggio, playing with them in the Italian Serie C2 and Serie D tiers.

Pisa
In summer 2003, he joined Pisa of Serie C1.

Brescia
In 2004–05 season he joined Serie A club Brescia. On 12 September 2004, he made his Serie A debut against Juventus. He stayed with Brescia after they were relegated to Serie B in summer 2005, and played with them until 31 January 2008.

Napoli
He left for Serie A club Napoli on 31 January 2008, joining fellow Brescia players Santacroce and Hamsik, for a total fee of €18 million within a season. Mannini himself was tagged for €7 million. In January 2009 he was handed a one-year suspension by the Court of Arbitration for Sport (CAS) along with former teammate Davide Possanzini from WADA for being late for a drugs test following a Serie B match between Brescia and Chievo in December 2007. Later the ban was frozen by CAS due to appeal process., The ban was cancelled on 27 July 2009 after being proved there was no real intention to avoid the controls from Possanzini and Mannini.

Sampdoria
In July 2009, Mannini joined Sampdoria in co-ownership bid, for €3.5 million (€7 million divided half). On the same day Hugo Campagnaro joined Napoli for €7 million.

Mannini made an excellent start in his first season at Sampdoria, scoring 5 goals in Serie A and 3 assists in just 8 games.

At the end of 2010–11 Serie A, Doria was relegated. The club gave up the co-ownership and allowed players to return to their mother clubs for a peppercorn fee of €500 each, such as keeper Gianluca Curci and winger Stefano Guberti. However the co-ownership of Mannini was not resolved before the deadline on 24 June. Thus, both clubs had to submit a bid in a sealed envelope to Lega Serie A in order to decide the highest bidder, which was only €500. on the other hand, Sampdoria abstain entirely from making an offer.

Siena
On 6 August 2011, Mannini moved to newly promoted Serie A club Siena in another co-ownership deal for €450,000 (plus €200,000 other fee) in a 4-year contract. In June 2013 Siena acquired Mannini outright for free after the club was relegated. Both clubs failed to form any deal before the deadline, but Napoli did not submit a bid.

Pisa (loan)
On 31 January 2014 he was signed by the third level club Pisa in a temporary deal. He was released after Siena failed to register for 2014–15 Serie B.

Lecce
On 1 September 2014 he was signed by U.S. Lecce.

Return to Pisa
Mannini was re-signed by Pisa on 27 August 2015.

Pontedera
On 15 January 2020, his contract with Pontedera was terminated by mutual consent.

Beverley Town
Having been released by Pontedera, Mannini elected to retire from football, and moved to East Yorkshire to work as a sales executive for a food company. During a chance encounter while they were both out walking dogs, Mannini met Mark Smith, the chairman of Beverley Town, a local team preparing for their first ever season in Division One of the Northern Counties East Football League, which saw Smith invite Mannini to pre-season training. On 22 July 2022, Beverley Town announced that Mannini had joined them for the upcoming season.

References

External links
 La Gazzetta dello Sport profile (2007–08) 
 Profile at FIGC 
 Lega Serie B profile 

1983 births
Living people
People from Viareggio
Sportspeople from the Province of Lucca
Footballers from Tuscany
Italian footballers
Association football midfielders
S.S.D. Lucchese 1905 players
F.C. Esperia Viareggio players
Pisa S.C. players
Brescia Calcio players
S.S.C. Napoli players
U.C. Sampdoria players
A.C.N. Siena 1904 players
U.S. Lecce players
U.S. Città di Pontedera players
Beverley Town F.C. players
Serie A players
Serie B players
Serie C players
Italian expatriate footballers
Expatriate footballers in England
Italian expatriate sportspeople in England